The Best Imitation of Myself: A Retrospective is a compilation album by American singer-songwriter Ben Folds and his alternative rock trio Ben Folds Five, released in the United States of America on October 11, 2011, by Legacy Records. The title comes from a song from their 1995 self-titled debut album.

The standard-edition album contains 17 popular songs from the band's discography and Folds' subsequent solo career, as well as the new Ben Folds Five single "House", which debuted on the website for the NBC competition show The Sing-Off, on which Folds was a judge.

An expanded edition includes 43 additional tracks over three discs, including two more new songs from Ben Folds Five recorded in 2011. Folds also made available through his website the additional album Fifty-Five Vault, a 56-track collection of rarities. A five-track sampler from this album, Free Folds Five, was included with digital copies of The Best Imitation of Myself.

Track listing

Disc 1

Disc 2

Disc 3

Free Folds Five

References

External links 
 Official Site

Ben Folds albums
2011 compilation albums